Lieselotte Berger (November 13, 1920 – September 26, 1989) was a German politician of the Christian Democratic Union (CDU) and former member of the German Bundestag.

Life 
Since 1958, she was a member of the CDU. From 1965, she was a member of the CDU state executive committee in Berlin and from 1973 deputy CDU state chairwoman in Berlin.

On 26 August 1971, when she succeeded Karl-Heinz Schmitz, she joined the German Bundestag as a Berlin member. She was then a member of the German Bundestag until her death. Here she was chairman of the Petitions Committee from 1972 to 1987.

After the 1987 federal elections, she became Parliamentary State Secretary to the Federal Chancellor and Plenipotentiary of the Federal Government in Berlin on 12 March 1987. She held this office until her death.

Literature

References

1920 births
1989 deaths
Members of the Bundestag for Berlin
Members of the Bundestag 1987–1990
Members of the Bundestag 1983–1987
Members of the Bundestag 1980–1983
Members of the Bundestag 1976–1980
Members of the Bundestag 1972–1976
Members of the Bundestag 1969–1972
Female members of the Bundestag
20th-century German women politicians
Members of the Bundestag for the Christian Democratic Union of Germany
Parliamentary State Secretaries of Germany